Eric Wilson (born 29 April 1945) is a former  Australian rules footballer who played with South Melbourne in the Victorian Football League (VFL).

Notes

External links 

Living people
1945 births
Australian rules footballers from Western Australia
Sydney Swans players